Major-General Sir (Cecil) Lothian Nicholson  (1 November 1865 – 3 March 1933) was a British Army officer.

Military career
Born the son of Sir Lothian Nicholson, a former Governor of Gibraltar, and Mary Romilly, Nicholson was commissioned into the Princess of Wales's Own Yorkshire Regiment on 29 August 1885. He became commanding officer of the 2nd Battalion East Lancashire Regiment in November 1914 and commanded his regiment at the Battle of Neuve Chapelle in March 1915 where he was wounded. He went on to command the 16th Brigade at Hooge in August 1915 and then became General Officer Commanding 34th Division commanding it at the Battle of the Somme in autumn 1916, the Battle of Arras in April 1917 and the Battle of the Lys in April 1918 as well as subsequent battles on the Western Front.

He was appointed a Companion of the Order of St Michael and St George in the 1916 Birthday Honours and a Companion of the Order of the Bath in the 1918 New Year Honours. He was then advanced to Knight Commander of the Order of the Bath in the 1919 Birthday Honours.

He went on to become General Officer Commanding the Eastern Division of the British Army of the Rhine in March 1919 and then General Officer Commanding 55th (West Lancashire) Infantry Division in April 1921 before retiring in April 1925.

References

|-

1856 births
1933 deaths
Knights Commander of the Order of the Bath
Companions of the Order of St Michael and St George
Green Howards officers
British Army generals of World War I
East Lancashire Regiment officers
British Army major generals